The Chicago Blackhawks are an American professional ice hockey team based in Chicago, Illinois. They play in the Central Division of the Western Conference in the National Hockey League (NHL). The team was first named the "Chicago Black Hawks", until 1986, when spelling found in the original franchise documents spelled the franchise name as the "Chicago Blackhawks", making the team change its name in response. The team is also referred to as the "Hawks". The Blackhawks began their NHL play in the 1926–27 season as an expansion team with the Detroit Cougars and the New York Rangers, and is one of the Original Six teams. The franchise has 6 Stanley Cup championships, most recently winning in the 2014–15 season. Having played in the Chicago Coliseum (1926–1929) and the Chicago Stadium (1929–1994), the Blackhawks have played their home games at the United Center since 1994. The Blackhawks are owned by Rocky Wirtz; Stan Bowman was the general manager, and Jonathan Toews is the team captain.

There have been 37 head coaches for the Blackhawks. The franchise's first head coach was Pete Muldoon, who coached for 44 games in the 1926–27 season. However, he is also well remembered for allegedly "putting a curse" on the Blackhawks, which stipulated that the team would never finish in first in the NHL. The Blackhawks never had a first-place finish until 40 years after that incident. Hughie Lehman, originally the team's goaltender, became the Blackhawks' third head coach after yelling at the first Blackhawks owner, Frederic McLaughlin, that his proposed plays were "the craziest bunch of junk [he had] ever seen".

Orval Tessier became the only head coach to have been awarded the Jack Adams Award with the Blackhawks by winning it in the 1982–83 season. Tommy Gorman, Tommy Ivan, and Rudy Pilous are the only Blackhawks head coaches to have been elected to the Hockey Hall of Fame as a builder.  Gorman, Bill Stewart, Pulios, and Joel Quenneville are the only coaches to have won a Stanley Cup championship as the head coach of the Hawks.

Billy Reay, the Blackhawks' head coach for 14 seasons, is the franchise's all-time leader for the most regular-season and playoff games coached and wins, with 1012 regular-season games coached, 516 regular-season game wins, 117 playoff games coached, and 57 playoff game wins. Twenty-three head coaches spent their entire NHL head coaching careers with the Blackhawks. Darryl Sutter and Brian Sutter are the only pair of brothers to have coached the Blackhawks; both coached the Hawks for three seasons each.

Jeremy Colliton assumed head coaching position on November 6, 2018, after Joel Quenneville was fired after at the beginning of the 2018–19 season. Quenneville was the head coach of the team since the 2008–09 season, and guided the Blackhawks to three Stanley Cup titles in 2010, 2013 and 2015. At the time of his firing, Quenneville was the second-winningest coach both in the Blackhawks and NHL history, and was also second in all-time games coached.



Key

Coaches

Notes
  A running total of the number of coaches of the Blackhawks; thus, any coach who has two or more separate terms as head coach is only counted once.
  Before the 2005–06 season, the NHL instituted a penalty shootout for regular season games that remained tied after a five-minute overtime period, which prevented ties.
  In ice hockey, the winning percentage is calculated by dividing points by maximum possible points.
  Each year is linked to an article about that particular NHL season.

References
General
 
Specific

 
coaches
Chicago Blackhawks head coaches